Tondoshka (Toñ-Toş) is a rural locality (a selo) in Tondoshenskoye Rural Settlement of Turochaksky District, the Altai Republic, Russia. The population was 294 as of 2016. There are 13 streets.

Geography 
Tondoshka is located at the confluence of the Tondoszka and Biya Rivers, 21 km south of Turochak (the district's administrative centre) by road. Sankin Ail is the nearest rural locality.

References 

Rural localities in Turochaksky District